The Blue Line is a  Chicago "L" line which extends through The Loop from O'Hare International Airport at the far northwest end of the city, through downtown via the Milwaukee–Dearborn subway and across the West Side to its southwest end at Forest Park, with a total of 33 stations (11 on the Forest Park branch, 9 in the Milwaukee–Dearborn subway and 13 on the O'Hare branch). At about 27 miles, it is the longest line on the Chicago "L" system and second busiest, and one of the longest local subway/elevated lines in the world. It has an average of 47,120 passengers boarding each weekday in 2021.

Chicago's Blue Line and Red Line offer 24-hour service, everyday, year-round. This makes Chicago, New York City, and Copenhagen the only three cities in the world to offer local nonstop rail service throughout their city limits 24-hours a day, seven days a week. The Blue Line is one of two lines in Chicago with more than one station having the same name, with the Green Line being the other. (The Blue Line has two stations at Harlem Avenue: one in the Kennedy Expressway on the Northwest side and one on the Eisenhower Expressway in Forest Park, Illinois. It also has two stations on Western Avenue: one on the segment between downtown and O’Hare, and one immediately west of downtown.) The Blue Line also has two in-system transfers (both in the Loop), and does not share tracks with any other 'L' line.

Before the adoption of color-coded names, the Blue Line was referred to as the West-Northwest Route, or more commonly, the O'Hare-Congress-Douglas route for its three branches. The Congress and Douglas branches were renamed for their terminals, Forest Park and 54th/Cermak, when the current color naming system was adopted in 1993. Blue Line service on the Douglas segment was replaced in April 2008 by the Pink Line.

The Blue Line is one of five 'L' lines that run into Chicago suburbs, with the others being the Green, Purple, Pink, and Yellow lines. The Blue Line runs in three suburbs; Rosemont, Oak Park, and Forest Park.

Route

O'Hare branch
The O'Hare branch  is the longest section of the Blue Line and comprises both the oldest and newest segments of the entire route. The line starts at O'Hare International Airport in an underground station below the airport's main parking garage, with direct pedestrian access to Terminals 1, 2 and 3. The line emerges in the median of the O'Hare main access road (Interstate 190) just northwest of Terminal 5, about a mile (1.6 km) west of Mannheim Road. 

The line runs in the median of Interstate 190 east through Rosemont. The tracks then tunnel beneath the Kennedy Expressway/Northwest Tollway interchange near the Des Plaines River. 

Between Montrose and Irving Park, the line tunnels beneath an express lane exit. South of Addison Street, the line descends into a subway and turns south under Kimball Avenue.

South of Logan Square, the line emerges above ground onto an elevated structure parallel to Milwaukee Avenue. This section of structure, built in 1895 as part of the Metropolitan Elevated's Logan Square branch, is the oldest portion of the Blue Line, and the sole section of the line on an elevated viaduct. The three stations on this section (and ) are also the only three stations on the line to use side platforms instead of island platforms.

Milwaukee–Dearborn subway

Jackson provides a transfer tunnel to the Red Line. Until October 2006, a transfer tunnel existed at Washington as well.

The tracks then emerge from a portal near  in the median of the Eisenhower Expressway (Interstate 290) and continue west.

Forest Park branch

After exiting the subway, the tracks continue west in the median of the Eisenhower Expressway as the Forest Park branch, formerly called the Congress branch, successor to the Garfield Park Branch.

This ramp was formerly used in revenue service from 1958 to 2008 when the Blue Line operated over the Cermak branch as well as the Forest Park branch. 

With the replacement of Cermak branch Blue Line service with the Pink Line, the ramp is now non-revenue trackage used primarily for the transfer of 5000 series trains that the Blue Line borrows from the Pink Line for rush hour service. The Forest Park branch remains in the median of the expressway through the west side of Chicago until it reaches a portal at Lotus Avenue. 

At this point the tracks pass beneath the eastbound expressway lanes and before emerging on the south side of the expressway next to the CSX Transportation (Baltimore and Ohio Chicago Terminal Railroad) tracks. The route passes through Oak Park and into Forest Park. In the vicinity of Desplaines Avenue the tracks rise and make an S-curve north over the expressway before terminating at the  station.

Former routings

Cermak branch

The Cermak branch, formerly known as the Douglas branch, previously was operated as part of the Blue Line. On April 28, 2008, the CTA eliminated Blue Line service on the Cermak branch, having been replaced by the Pink Line. The Loomis ramp that connects the Congress branch to the Cermak branch remains intact for non-revenue equipment moves, as the only track connection between the Blue Line and the rest of the system.

Operating hours and headways
Like the Red Line, the Blue Line runs 24 hours a day. Most trains run between O'Hare and Forest Park stations, but others terminate at a different station along the line. On weekdays, service runs very frequently (10-20 tph (trains per hour)) during rush hour (with some trains running short-turn services between UIC-Halsted and Jefferson Park or Rosemont), and 6-8tph during the midday and nighttime.

On Saturdays, service runs 8tph in the early morning, then increase to 10 tph during the day, then 8 tph at night. On Sundays, service runs 6-8 tph early morning, then increase to 10 tph all day, then 6 tph at night. On the weekends, every other Blue Line train operates between O'Hare and UIC-Halsted only during the daytime, doubling the headways up to 5 tph. Between approximately midnight and 5:30 a.m., night owl service on the Blue Line ranges between 2-4 tph.

Rolling stock

The Blue Line is operated with the 2600-series, 3200-series, and 7000-series railcars. In 2018, some of the 2600-series cars from the Blue Line fleet were replaced with the recently rehabbed 3200-series cars from the Brown and Orange Lines, with some of the 2600-series cars being reassigned to the Orange Line to replace them. These cars entered service on the Blue Line on September 17, 2018. In addition to the mix of the 2600-series and 3200-series cars, two 5000-series trainsets assigned to the Pink Line make trips on the Blue Line during weekday rush hours, although these cars remain officially assigned to the Pink Line and are operated by Pink Line operators.

History

The Blue Line is the successor to the Metropolitan West Side Elevated Railroad, which built a series of 'L' lines servicing the West Side of Chicago beginning in 1895. The first section to be built by the Metropolitan extended west in the vicinity of Van Buren Street from an independent terminal at Canal and Jackson Streets to Marshfield Avenue, and then northward in the vicinity of Paulina Street to Damen and Milwaukee Avenues. Service on this section began on May 6, 1895. The structure was completed from Damen Avenue to Logan Square on May 25, 1895.

The next stage in the development of the West Side 'L' came on June 19, 1895, when the Garfield Park Branch was added, extending west in the vicinity of Van Buren Street and Harrison Street from Marshfield Avenue to Cicero Avenue.  An extension of service over the tracks of the Aurora, Elgin and Chicago Railroad to a new terminal at Desplaines Avenue was established on March 11, 1905. A subsequent extension to Westchester opened on October 1, 1926, over tracks that had originally been built by the CA&E with the intentions of building a bypass route. (Low ridership would prompt the CTA to discontinue service on the Westchester extension on December 9, 1951.)

This was followed by still another addition when the Douglas Park Branch was placed in operation as far south as 18th Street on April 28, 1896.

As the southwest area of the city developed, the Douglas Park Branch was extended from 18th Street to Western Avenue in September 1896; to Pulaski Road in June 1902; to Cicero Avenue in December 1907; to Central Avenue in August 1912; to 62nd Avenue in August 1915, and to Oak Park Avenue in Berwyn on March 16, 1924. The Douglas Park branch was later cut back to 54th Avenue in Cicero.

The Metropolitan West Side Elevated began service onto the Loop on October 11, 1897, and a rush period stub terminal at Wells Street was added October 3, 1904. For much of the early 20th century and through the 1940s, service on the West Side Elevated lines went unchanged until 1947, when the Chicago Transit Authority took control of the 'L', initiating a series of massive service cuts and station closings (that would last until the 1980s).

The Metropolitan lines began to be reshaped into the current Blue Line on February 25, 1951, when the CTA opened the Milwaukee-Dearborn Subway, connecting the Logan Square Branch with the Loop on a fast, efficient and more direct routing to downtown, rather than the previous circuitous route that saw these trains entering the Loop at the southwest corner. With opening of the Dearborn Subway, the old elevated alignment between Evergreen Portal and Marshfield Junction was decommissioned, used only for moving out-of-service rail cars. The northern section of the connection between Evergreen Avenue and Lake Street was demolished in the 1960s, leaving the Lake Street to Douglas Branch section—better known as the Paulina Connector—the only section still in operation. The Humboldt Park Branch was cut back to a full-time shuttle between Damen and Lawndale, and discontinued a year later on May 3, 1952.

The Garfield Park elevated was replaced by the Congress line on June 22, 1958, pioneering the world's first use of rail rapid transit and a multi-lane automobile expressway in the same grade-separated right-of-way. (Pacific Electric Railway "Red Car" tracks ran in the median of the Cahuenga Parkway in Los Angeles from 1944 until its expansion into the Hollywood Freeway in 1952, but the Pacific Electric service was an interurban streetcar rather than true rapid transit.) The new line connected with the Milwaukee-Dearborn Subway at the Chicago River and extended westward to Des Plaines Avenue in Forest Park. Loomis Ramp, built at this same time, permitted Douglas trains to be rerouted through the subway as well combining the Logan Square, Garfield Park (now Congress) and Douglas routes into the second through service in Chicago, the Congress/Douglas-Milwaukee Line.

A five-mile (8 km) extension of the route via a short subway connection and the Kennedy Expressway median from Logan Square to Jefferson Park opened on February 1, 1970. It was also built by the City of Chicago using federal money. Just before Logan Square, trains diverted off of the old elevated structure and entered the subway under Milwaukee and Kedzie Avenues to a portal just south of Addison Street, then emerged in the median of the Kennedy Expressway to the temporary terminal at Jefferson Park. The increased ridership that resulted from the extension prompted the CTA to build the second phase of the project, and extend the line the rest of the way to O'Hare. In March 1980, construction began on the O'Hare Airport extension, with the first section between Jefferson Park and Rosemont opening on February 27, 1983, and the final section to O'Hare on September 3, 1984.

On February 21, 1993, the CTA adopted a color-coded naming system to the rapid transit system, and the West-Northwest route (O'Hare-Congress/Douglas) became the Blue Line. On April 26, 1998, the Douglas Branch lost its overnight (owl) and weekend service and began operating between 4 a.m. and 1 a.m. on weekdays only as a result of budget cuts that also eliminated owl service on several other lines. Congress (Forest Park) service was effectively doubled through much of the day since service frequency from O'Hare required shorter headways than what would have been left.

While the CTA claimed Douglas branch reductions were due to low ridership, community activists also pointed to badly deteriorated infrastructure and funding shortfalls, as well as a perception that the CTA was uninterested in serving the West Side. On September 10, 2001, the CTA began a historic reconstruction of the Douglas Branch to repair its aging stations and tracks. The work was officially completed on January 8, 2005, with new elevated structures, tracks, rebuilt stations, new communication networks and an upgraded power system along the route. On January 1, 2005, weekend service was restored.

In January 2005, the CTA held hearings on a proposal to reroute Douglas Branch service via the recently rebuilt Paulina Connector to the Lake Street Green Line, carrying Douglas trains to and around the elevated Loop for the first time since 1958. It was the first stage of what became the Pink Line. This would have allowed a doubling of Blue Line trains to Forest Park on the Congress Branch, since service would no longer be divided between the Forest Park and 54th/Cermak terminals. Due to community fears that the Pink Line would not be enough, however, the CTA decided to retain limited Douglas Branch Blue Line service during weekday rush hours.

On February 15, 2006, the CTA approved the separate operation of the Douglas Branch plan. All non-rush hour trains would all be routed via the Loop, Green Line and Paulina Connector. During rush hour, service was available on the new route as well as the existing route via the Milwaukee-Dearborn Subway. These changes were scheduled to be implemented for a 180-day trial period beginning June 25, 2006 and after their evaluation in early 2007, the Pink Line remained in service.

Beginning April 28, 2008, the CTA began a six-month experimental ceasing of Blue Line operations on the Douglas. All Douglas Branch operations are now served by the Pink Line. On December 4, 2008, CTA announced its decision to permanently discontinue Blue Line service on the Douglas branch and to make the Pink Line permanent.

On October 15, 2015, the CTA announced the completed installation of 4G wireless service on the Blue Line in between the Logan Square and Belmont stations. In the future this will mean that the CTA will be the largest rapid transit system with 4G coverage in subway tunnels and stations, this is targeted for the end of 2015.

Accidents and incidents
On July 11, 2006, a derailment caused a smoky fire in the Blue Line's Milwaukee-Dearborn Subway. There were injuries from smoke inhalation, but no fatalities. The comparatively minor incident prompted heavy news coverage and a temporary stoppage of Chicago subway service because it occurred hours after train bombings in Mumbai earlier the same day.

Earlier, the train had arrived at Forest Park, and went out of service. However, after the train pulled into the Desplaines Yard, it was left on. There were no passengers on the out-of-service train; the number of workers on it at the time of the crash was also an unknown. Also unknown was the total number of passengers on the outbound, in-service train. The investigation started shortly thereafter. Though service soon went back to normal, trains did not stop at the Harlem station until the late evening on Tuesday, October 1, 2013, to avoid interference with the scene and congestion. The NTSB concluded that the probable cause was water in the control cables and insufficient securing of unattended equipment.

In the early morning of March 24, 2014, a Blue Line train derailed at O'Hare at the end of its run. Initial reports said that 32 passengers on the train were injured, but none of the injuries were considered life-threatening. The station reopened on Sunday, March 30, 2014, at 2:00 p.m.

On April 10, 2019, a Blue Line train derailed in the tunnel near O'Hare station.

Expansion

Line extensions

For the past twenty years, there had been talk of extending the O'Hare section of the Blue Line westward to Schaumburg, but that has been changed, due to recent developments involving the planning of the Metra STAR Line and various other transportation projects.

However, in 2008, the Regional Transit Authority revealed a plan to the RTA board to expand commuter rail and bus service, which included a  extension of the Blue Line on an east–west route, from its current western terminus at Forest Park as far west as the Yorktown shopping center in DuPage County. Several feeder bus services would also be implemented along the route in order to supplement ridership and increase its usefulness. The prospect of this extension was also listed in the Chicago region's 2030 long-term master plan.

In early 2013, the idea of an infill station at Nagle and Bryn Mawr Avenues was declined.

In December 2016, Pace introduced the on-highway BRT I-90 Express service. The successor to the Blue line Extension and the STAR Line, this service serves as an extension of the Blue Line and provides rapid service along I-90 all the way to Elgin.

Extra tracks

The surface right-of-way for the Congress Branch, including overcrossings, undergrade bridges and two short tunnels under the expressway, contains space for one extra track between Forest Park and Kenton Avenue and two extra tracks from Kenton to the tunnel portals at UIC-Halsted. It was intended that the interurban Chicago Aurora and Elgin Railroad, which had utilized the Garfield Park Elevated until 1953 to reach its Loop terminal at Wells Street, would use these extra tracks. However, the CA&E ceased passenger service abruptly on July 3, 1957, never to resume, before track construction had started. The CTA also considered plans of its own to add these as express tracks (and service) over the years, as well as a rerouting of the Lake Elevated onto the Paulina Elevated (today's Pink Line) into a new quadrant of the junction with the Douglas Line at Racine, but these plans also never came to existence.

Stub tunnels

The dual portals of the Congress Branch at UIC-Halsted are actually quadruple. Two extra portals exist to the north of the Blue Line portals, which extend only a few dozen feet beyond the portals. These were intended to accommodate future expansion, including a new CA&E line to a new terminal, or for a variety of later CTA new line proposals which were never realized. Among those plans were a loop subway system via Congress, Dearborn, Lake, and Clinton when the Milwaukee-Dearborn-Congress Subway was completed between 1951 and 1958, and a shuttle subway route under Jackson Street to Grant Park (1958, "New Horizons for Chicago Metropolitan Area", CTA). 

Between 1968 and 1978 a plan in the form of the Distributor Subway system was proposed, which was to be routed from UIC-Halsted Station through the north portals, then north under Desplaines Street to Monroe Street and east under Monroe Street to Grant and Millennium Park, where it was to split into two branches: one north to Walton Street serving the North Michigan Avenue area and the other southeast to McCormick Place utilizing Metra Electric right-of-way. Though these portals are still not used, the Monroe Street Distributor Subway was never "officially" cancelled when the Crosstown and Loop Subway projects were deferred in 1979. It remains to this day an active program.

Between Grand/Milwaukee and Clark/Lake in the Milwaukee-Dearborn Subway, two more stub tunnels exist, continuing west under Lake Street while the in-service tracks turn northwest under Milwaukee Avenue. This junction (actually a stacked junction), built in the 1940s along with the subway, was intended for a never-built connection to, or subway replacement of the Lake Street Elevated. In the late 1960s through the mid-1970s, they were also proposed to be a service link between the Dearborn Subway and a high-speed subway route in Randolph Street to replace a portion of the Lake Street 'L' east of Damen Avenue (Transit Planning Study Chicago Central Area, April 1968).

Station listing

References

External links

 Blue Line at CTA official site

Chicago O'Hare
 
Railway lines in Chicago
Railway lines in highway medians
1895 establishments in Illinois
Railway lines opened in 1895
O'Hare International Airport